Hirakud Airstrip, also known as Sambalpur Airstrip,  is a public airstrip owned by Government of Odisha located 12 kilometres north of Sambalpur in western Odisha, India.

References

Airports in Odisha
Buildings and structures in Sambalpur district
Airports with year of establishment missing